Movistar Arena refers to:
 Movistar Arena (Bogotá), an indoor arena in Bogotá, Colombia
 Movistar Arena (Buenos Aires), an indoor arena in Buenos Aires, Argentina
 Movistar Arena (Santiago), an indoor arena in Santiago, Chile